Never Rest In Peace is the second studio album by ska-punk/anarcho-punk band Star Fucking Hipsters. It officially released on Tuesday, October 20, 2009 on Alternative Tentacles, although those who purchased the album on the Alternative Tentacles website received the album before the official release date.

Singles
The band released a video for the song "3000 Miles Away" which features Ethan Suplee of American History X, Boy Meets World, and My Name is Earl fame.

Track listing
All songs written by Star Fucking Hipsters except  "Look Who's Talking Now!" written by Sturg and Brandon Chevalier-Koling, and "Heaven" written by the Degenerics.

Personnel
Nico de Gaillo: Vocals
Scott Sturgeon: Vocals, Guitar
Frank Piegaro: Guitar
Chris Pothier: Bass
Alex Charpentier: drums
Brian "Pnut" Kozuch: drums

Additional musicians
Roberto Miguel: horns
Craig Fu Yong: additional vocals
Jasper Peterson: additional vocals
Dick Lucas: additional vocals
Bill Cashman: background vocals
Bryan Alien: background vocals
Fran Araya: background vocals
Bryan Kienlen: background vocals
Mike Dreg: background vocals
Canadian Jay: background vocals
Filthy Phil: background vocals
Lil Jil: background vocals

Production
Ryan Jones: mixing
Howard Weinberg: mastering

References

2009 albums
Star Fucking Hipsters albums
Alternative Tentacles albums